Christmas is an annual festival commemorating the birth of Jesus Christ, observed primarily on December 25 as a religious and cultural celebration among billions of people around the world. A feast central to the Christian liturgical year, it is preceded by the season of Advent or the Nativity Fast and initiates the season of Christmastide, which historically in the West lasts twelve days and culminates on Twelfth Night. Christmas Day is a public holiday in many countries, is celebrated religiously by a majority of Christians, as well as culturally by many non-Christians, and forms an integral part of the holiday season organized around it.

The traditional Christmas narrative recounted in the New Testament, known as the Nativity of Jesus, says that Jesus was born in Bethlehem, in accordance with messianic prophecies. When Joseph and Mary arrived in the city, the inn had no room and so they were offered a stable where the Christ Child was soon born, with angels proclaiming this news to shepherds who then spread the word.

There are different hypotheses regarding the date of Jesus' birth and in the early fourth century, the church fixed the date as December 25. This corresponds to the traditional date of the winter solstice on the Roman calendar. It is exactly nine months after Annunciation on March 25, also the date of the spring equinox. Most Christians celebrate on December 25 in the Gregorian calendar, which has been adopted almost universally in the civil calendars used in countries throughout the world. However, part of the Eastern Christian Churches celebrate Christmas on December 25 of the older Julian calendar, which currently corresponds to January 7 in the Gregorian calendar. For Christians, believing that God came into the world in the form of man to atone for the sins of humanity, rather than knowing Jesus' exact birth date, is considered to be the primary purpose in celebrating Christmas.

The celebratory customs associated in various countries with Christmas have a mix of pre-Christian, Christian, and secular themes and origins. Popular modern customs of the holiday include gift giving; completing an Advent calendar or Advent wreath; Christmas music and caroling; viewing a Nativity play; an exchange of Christmas cards; church services; a special meal; and the display of various Christmas decorations, including Christmas trees, Christmas lights, nativity scenes, garlands, wreaths, mistletoe, and holly. In addition, several closely related and often interchangeable figures, known as Santa Claus, Father Christmas, Saint Nicholas, and Christkind, are associated with bringing gifts to children during the Christmas season and have their own body of traditions and lore. Because gift-giving and many other aspects of the Christmas festival involve heightened economic activity, the holiday has become a significant event and a key sales period for retailers and businesses. Over the past few centuries, Christmas has had a steadily growing economic effect in many regions of the world.

Etymology 

The English word "Christmas" is a shortened form of "Christ's Mass". The word is recorded as Crīstesmæsse in 1038 and Cristes-messe in 1131. Crīst (genitive Crīstes) is from Greek Khrīstos (Χριστός), a translation of Hebrew Māšîaḥ (מָשִׁיחַ), "Messiah", meaning "anointed"; and mæsse is from Latin missa, the celebration of the Eucharist.

The form Christenmas was also used during some periods, but is now considered archaic and dialectal. The term derives from Middle English Cristenmasse, meaning "Christian mass". Xmas is an abbreviation of Christmas found particularly in print, based on the initial letter chi (Χ) in Greek Khrīstos (Χριστός) ("Christ"), although some style guides discourage its use. This abbreviation has precedent in Middle English Χρ̄es masse (where "Χρ̄" is an abbreviation for Χριστός).

Other names 

In addition to "Christmas", the holiday has had various other English names throughout its history. The Anglo-Saxons referred to the feast as "midwinter", or, more rarely, as Nātiuiteð (from Latin nātīvitās below). "Nativity", meaning "birth", is from Latin nātīvitās. In Old English, Gēola (Yule) referred to the period corresponding to December and January, which was eventually equated with Christian Christmas. "Noel" (also "Nowel" or "Nowell", as in "The First Nowell") entered English in the late 14th century and is from the Old French noël or naël, itself ultimately from the Latin nātālis (diēs) meaning "birth (day)".

Koleda is the traditional Slavic name for Christmas and the period from Christmas to Epiphany or, more generally, to Slavic Christmas-related rituals, some dating to pre-Christian times. It is actually used in Bulgarian.

Nativity 

The gospels of Luke and Matthew describe Jesus as being born in Bethlehem to the Virgin Mary. In the gospel of Luke, Joseph and Mary traveled from Nazareth to Bethlehem for the census, and Jesus was born there and placed in a manger. Angels proclaimed him a savior for all people, and shepherds came to adore him. The gospel of Matthew adds that the magi followed a star to Bethlehem to bring gifts to Jesus, born the king of the Jews. King Herod ordered the massacre of all the boys less than two years old in Bethlehem, but the family fled to Egypt and later returned to Nazareth.

History 

The nativity sequences included in the Gospels of Matthew and Luke prompted early Christian writers to suggest various dates for the anniversary.

At the time of the 2nd century, the "earliest church records" indicate that "Christians were remembering and celebrating the birth of the Lord", an "observance [that] sprang up organically from the authentic devotion of ordinary believers." Though Christmas did not appear on the lists of festivals given by the early Christian writers Irenaeus and Tertullian, the Chronograph of 354 records that a Christmas celebration took place in Rome eight days before the calends of January. This section was written in AD 336, during the brief pontificate of Pope Mark.

In the East, the birth of Jesus was celebrated in connection with the Epiphany on January 6. This holiday was not primarily about the nativity, but rather the baptism of Jesus. Christmas was promoted in the East as part of the revival of Orthodox Christianity that followed the death of the pro-Arian Emperor Valens at the Battle of Adrianople in 378. The feast was introduced in Constantinople in 379, in Antioch by John Chrysostom towards the end of the fourth century, probably in 388, and in Alexandria in the following century. The presence of hymns for the feast in the Georgian Iadgari demonstrates that it was celebrated in Jerusalem by the 6th century at the latest.

The first recorded Christmas celebration was in Rome on December 25, AD 336. In the 3rd century, the date of the nativity was the subject of great interest. Around AD 200, Clement of Alexandria wrote:
 Various factors contributed to the selection of December 25 as a date of celebration: it was nine months after the date linked to the conception of Jesus—March 25, which also marked the vernal equinox (celebrated as the Feast of the Annunciation) and it was the date of the winter solstice on the Roman calendar. Adam C. English, Professor of Religion at Campbell University, writes:

The early Church Fathers John Chrysostom, Augustine of Hippo, and Jerome attested to 25 December as the date of Christmas. The primitive Church connected Jesus to the Sun through the use of such phrases as "Sun of righteousness." The early Christian writer Lactantius wrote "the east is attached to God because he is the source of light and the illuminator of the world and he makes us rise toward eternal life." It is for this reason that the early Christians established the direction of prayer as being eastward, towards the rising sun. In the Roman Empire, in which many Christians resided, the winter solstice was marked on December 25.

In 567, the Council of Tours put in place the season of Christmastide, proclaiming "the twelve days from Christmas to Epiphany as a sacred and festive season, and established the duty of Advent fasting in preparation for the feast." This was done in order to solve the "administrative problem for the Roman Empire as it tried to coordinate the solar Julian calendar with the lunar calendars of its provinces in the east."

Christmas played a role in the Arian controversy of the fourth century. After this controversy ran its course, the prominence of the holiday declined for a few centuries. The feast regained prominence after 800 when Charlemagne was crowned emperor on Christmas Day.

In Puritan England, Christmas was banned, with Puritans considering it a Catholic invention and also associating the day with drunkenness and other misbehaviour. It was restored as a legal holiday in England in 1660 when Puritan legislation was declared null and void, but it remained disreputable in the minds of some. In the early 19th century, Christmas festivities and services became widespread with the rise of the Oxford Movement in the Church of England that emphasized the centrality of Christmas in Christianity and charity to the poor, along with Washington Irving, Charles Dickens, and other authors emphasizing family, children, kind-heartedness, gift-giving, and Santa Claus (for Irving), or Father Christmas (for Dickens).

Various theories have been offered with respect to the establishment of the dates on which the Christian Churches came to celebrate Christmas:

Calculation hypothesis 

The calculation hypothesis suggests that an earlier holiday, the Annunciation (which celebrated the conception of Jesus), held on March 25 became associated with the Incarnation. Christmas was then calculated as nine months later. The calculation hypothesis was proposed by French writer Louis Duchesne in 1889. The Bible in  records the annunciation to Mary to be at the time when Elizabeth, mother of John the Baptist, was in her sixth month of pregnancy (cf. Nativity of Saint John the Baptist). Thus, the ecclesiastical holiday to commemorate the Annunciation of the Lord was created in the seventh century and was assigned to be celebrated on March 25; this date is nine months before Christmas, in addition to being the traditional date of the equinox. It is unrelated to the Quartodeciman, which had been forgotten by this time.

Early Christians celebrated the life of Jesus on a date considered equivalent to 14 Nisan (Passover) on the local calendar. Because Passover was held on the 14th of the month, this feast is referred to as the Quartodeciman. All the major events of Christ's life, especially the passion, were celebrated on this date. In his letter to the Corinthians, Paul mentions Passover, presumably celebrated according to the local calendar in Corinth. Tertullian (d. 220), who lived in Latin-speaking North Africa, gives the date of passion celebration as March 25. The date of the passion was moved to Good Friday in 165. According to the calculation hypothesis, the celebration of the Quartodeciman continued in some areas and the feast became associated with Incarnation.

The calculation hypothesis is considered academically to be "a thoroughly viable hypothesis", though not certain. It was a traditional Jewish belief that great men were born and died on the same day, so lived a whole number of years, without fractions: Jesus was therefore considered to have been conceived on March 25, as he died on March 25, which was calculated to have coincided with 14 Nisan. A passage in Commentary on the Prophet Daniel (204) by Hippolytus of Rome identifies December 25 as the date of the nativity. This passage is generally considered a late interpolation. But the manuscript includes another passage, one that is more likely to be authentic, that gives the passion as March 25.

In 221, Sextus Julius Africanus (c. 160 – c. 240) gave March 25 as the day of creation and of the conception of Jesus in his universal history. This conclusion was based on solar symbolism, with March 25 the date of the equinox. As this implies a birth in December, it is sometimes claimed to be the earliest identification of December 25 as the nativity. However, Africanus was not such an influential writer that it is likely he determined the date of Christmas.

The treatise De solstitia et aequinoctia conceptionis et nativitatis Domini nostri Iesu Christi et Iohannis Baptistae, pseudepigraphically attributed to John Chrysostom and dating to the early fourth century, also argued that Jesus was conceived and crucified on the same day of the year and calculated this as March 25. This anonymous tract also states: "But Our Lord, too, is born in the month of December ... the eight before the calends of January [25 December] ..., But they call it the 'Birthday of the Unconquered'. Who indeed is so unconquered as Our Lord...? Or, if they say that it is the birthday of the Sun, He is the Sun of Justice."

Solstice date hypothesis 

December 25 was considered the date of the winter solstice in the Roman calendar, though actually it occurred on the 23rd or 24th at that time. A late fourth-century sermon by Saint Augustine explains why this was a fitting day to celebrate Christ's nativity: "Hence it is that He was born on the day which is the shortest in our earthly reckoning and from which subsequent days begin to increase in length. He, therefore, who bent low and lifted us up chose the shortest day, yet the one whence light begins to increase."

Linking Jesus to the Sun was supported by various Biblical passages. Jesus was considered to be the "Sun of righteousness" prophesied by Malachi: "Unto you shall the sun of righteousness arise, and healing is in his wings."

Such solar symbolism could support more than one date of birth. An anonymous work known as De Pascha Computus (243) linked the idea that creation began at the spring equinox, on March 25, with the conception or birth (the word nascor can mean either) of Jesus on March 28, the day of the creation of the sun in the Genesis account. One translation reads: "O the splendid and divine providence of the Lord, that on that day, the very day, on which the sun was made, March 28, a Wednesday, Christ should be born".

In the 17th century, Isaac Newton, who, coincidentally, was born on December 25, argued that the date of Christmas may have been selected to correspond with the solstice.

Conversely, according to Steven Hijmans of the University of Alberta, "It is cosmic symbolism ... which inspired the Church leadership in Rome to elect the southern solstice, December 25, as the birthday of Christ, and the northern solstice as that of John the Baptist, supplemented by the equinoxes as their respective dates of conception."

History of religions hypothesis 

The rival "History of Religions" hypothesis suggests that the Church selected December 25 date to appropriate festivities held by the Romans in honor of the Sun god Sol Invictus. This cult was established by Aurelian in 274. An explicit expression of this theory appears in an annotation of uncertain date added to a manuscript of a work by 12th-century Syrian bishop Jacob Bar-Salibi. The scribe who added it wrote:

In 1743, German Protestant Paul Ernst Jablonski argued Christmas was placed on December 25 to correspond with the Roman solar holiday Dies Natalis Solis Invicti and was therefore a "paganization" that debased the true church. However, it has been also argued that, on the contrary, the Emperor Aurelian, who in 274 instituted the holiday of the Dies Natalis Solis Invicti, did so partly as an attempt to give a pagan significance to a date already important for Christians in Rome.

Hermann Usener and others proposed that the Christians chose this day because it was the Roman feast celebrating the birthday of Sol Invictus. Modern scholar S. E. Hijmans, however, states that "While they were aware that pagans called this day the 'birthday' of Sol Invictus, this did not concern them and it did not play any role in their choice of date for Christmas." Moreover, Thomas J. Talley holds that the Roman Emperor Aurelian placed a festival of Sol Invictus on December 25 in order to compete with the growing rate of the Christian Church, which had already been celebrating Christmas on that date first. In the judgement of the Church of England Liturgical Commission, the History of Religions hypothesis has been challenged by a view based on an old tradition, according to which the date of Christmas was fixed at nine months after March 25, the date of the vernal equinox, on which the Annunciation was celebrated. Adam C. English, Professor of Religion at Campbell University, writes:

With regard to a December religious feast of the deified Sun (Sol), as distinct from a solstice feast of the birth (or rebirth) of the astronomical sun, Hijmans has commented that "while the winter solstice on or around December 25 was well established in the Roman imperial calendar, there is no evidence that a religious celebration of Sol on that day antedated the celebration of Christmas". "Thomas Talley has shown that, although the Emperor Aurelian's dedication of a temple to the sun god in the Campus Martius (C.E. 274) probably took place on the 'Birthday of the Invincible Sun' on December 25, the cult of the sun in pagan Rome ironically did not celebrate the winter solstice nor any of the other quarter-tense days, as one might expect." The Oxford Companion to Christian Thought remarks on the uncertainty about the order of precedence between the religious celebrations of the Birthday of the Unconquered Sun and of the birthday of Jesus, stating that the hypothesis that December 25 was chosen for celebrating the birth of Jesus on the basis of the belief that his conception occurred on March 25 "potentially establishes 25 December as a Christian festival before Aurelian's decree, which, when promulgated, might have provided for the Christian feast both opportunity and challenge".

Relation to concurrent celebrations 

Many popular customs associated with Christmas developed independently of the commemoration of Jesus' birth, with some claiming that certain elements are Christianized and have origins in pre-Christian festivals that were celebrated by pagan populations who were later converted to Christianity; other scholars reject these claims and affirm that Christmas customs largely developed in a Christian context. The prevailing atmosphere of Christmas has also continually evolved since the holiday's inception, ranging from a sometimes raucous, drunken, carnival-like state in the Middle Ages, to a tamer family-oriented and children-centered theme introduced in a 19th-century transformation. The celebration of Christmas was banned on more than one occasion within certain groups, such as the Puritans and Jehovah's Witnesses (who do not celebrate birthdays in general), due to concerns that it was too unbiblical.

Prior to and through the early Christian centuries, winter festivals were the most popular of the year in many European pagan cultures. Reasons included the fact that less agricultural work needed to be done during the winter, as well as an expectation of better weather as spring approached. Celtic winter herbs such as mistletoe and ivy, and the custom of kissing under a mistletoe, are common in modern Christmas celebrations in the English-speaking countries.

The pre-Christian Germanic peoples—including the Anglo-Saxons and the Norse—celebrated a winter festival called Yule, held in the late December to early January period, yielding modern English yule, today used as a synonym for Christmas. In Germanic language-speaking areas, numerous elements of modern Christmas folk custom and iconography may have originated from Yule, including the Yule log, Yule boar, and the Yule goat. Often leading a ghostly procession through the sky (the Wild Hunt), the long-bearded god Odin is referred to as "the Yule one" and "Yule father" in Old Norse texts, while other gods are referred to as "Yule beings". On the other hand, as there are no reliable existing references to a Christmas log prior to the 16th century, the burning of the Christmas block may have been an early modern invention by Christians unrelated to the pagan practice.

In eastern Europe also, pre-Christian traditions were incorporated into Christmas celebrations there, an example being the Koleda, which shares parallels with the Christmas carol.

Post-classical history 

In the Early Middle Ages, Christmas Day was overshadowed by Epiphany, which in western Christianity focused on the visit of the magi. But the medieval calendar was dominated by Christmas-related holidays. The forty days before Christmas became the "forty days of St. Martin" (which began on November 11, the feast of St. Martin of Tours), now known as Advent. In Italy, former Saturnalian traditions were attached to Advent. Around the 12th century, these traditions transferred again to the Twelve Days of Christmas (December 25 – January 5); a time that appears in the liturgical calendars as Christmastide or Twelve Holy Days.

The prominence of Christmas Day increased gradually after Charlemagne was crowned Emperor on Christmas Day in 800. King Edmund the Martyr was anointed on Christmas in 855 and King William I of England was crowned on Christmas Day 1066.

By the High Middle Ages, the holiday had become so prominent that chroniclers routinely noted where various magnates celebrated Christmas. King Richard II of England hosted a Christmas feast in 1377 at which 28 oxen and 300 sheep were eaten. The Yule boar was a common feature of medieval Christmas feasts. Caroling also became popular, and was originally performed by a group of dancers who sang. The group was composed of a lead singer and a ring of dancers that provided the chorus. Various writers of the time condemned caroling as lewd, indicating that the unruly traditions of Saturnalia and Yule may have continued in this form. "Misrule"—drunkenness, promiscuity, gambling—was also an important aspect of the festival. In England, gifts were exchanged on New Year's Day, and there was special Christmas ale.

Christmas during the Middle Ages was a public festival that incorporated ivy, holly, and other evergreens. Christmas gift-giving during the Middle Ages was usually between people with legal relationships, such as tenant and landlord. The annual indulgence in eating, dancing, singing, sporting, and card playing escalated in England, and by the 17th century the Christmas season featured lavish dinners, elaborate masques, and pageants. In 1607, King James I insisted that a play be acted on Christmas night and that the court indulge in games. It was during the Reformation in 16th–17th-century Europe that many Protestants changed the gift bringer to the Christ Child or Christkindl, and the date of giving gifts changed from December 6 to Christmas Eve.

Modern history

17th and 18th centuries 

Following the Protestant Reformation, many of the new denominations, including the Anglican Church and Lutheran Church, continued to celebrate Christmas. In 1629, the Anglican poet John Milton penned On the Morning of Christ's Nativity, a poem that has since been read by many during Christmastide. Donald Heinz, a professor at California State University, states that Martin Luther "inaugurated a period in which Germany would produce a unique culture of Christmas, much copied in North America." Among the congregations of the Dutch Reformed Church, Christmas was celebrated as one of the principal evangelical feasts.

However, in 17th century England, some groups such as the Puritans strongly condemned the celebration of Christmas, considering it a Catholic invention and the "trappings of popery" or the "rags of the Beast". In contrast, the established Anglican Church "pressed for a more elaborate observance of feasts, penitential seasons, and saints' days. The calendar reform became a major point of tension between the Anglican party and the Puritan party." The Catholic Church also responded, promoting the festival in a more religiously oriented form. King Charles I of England directed his noblemen and gentry to return to their landed estates in midwinter to keep up their old-style Christmas generosity. Following the Parliamentarian victory over Charles I during the English Civil War, England's Puritan rulers banned Christmas in 1647.

Protests followed as pro-Christmas rioting broke out in several cities and for weeks Canterbury was controlled by the rioters, who decorated doorways with holly and shouted royalist slogans. The book, The Vindication of Christmas (London, 1652), argued against the Puritans, and makes note of Old English Christmas traditions, dinner, roast apples on the fire, card playing, dances with "plow-boys" and "maidservants", old Father Christmas and carol singing. During the ban, semi-clandestine religious services marking Christ's birth continued to be held, and people sang carols in secret.

The Restoration of King Charles II in 1660 ended the ban, and Christmas was again freely celebrated in England. Many Calvinist clergymen disapproved of Christmas celebration. As such, in Scotland, the Presbyterian Church of Scotland discouraged the observance of Christmas, and though James VI commanded its celebration in 1618, attendance at church was scant. The Parliament of Scotland officially abolished the observance of Christmas in 1640, claiming that the church had been "purged of all superstitious observation of days". Whereas in England, Wales and Ireland Christmas Day is a common law holiday, having been a customary holiday since time immemorial, it was not until 1871 that it was designated a bank holiday in Scotland.

Following the Restoration of Charles II, Poor Robin's Almanack contained the lines: "Now thanks to God for Charles return, / Whose absence made old Christmas mourn. / For then we scarcely did it know, / Whether it Christmas were or no." The diary of James Woodforde, from the latter half of the 18th century, details the observance of Christmas and celebrations associated with the season over a number of years.

As in England, Puritans in Colonial America staunchly opposed the observation of Christmas. The Pilgrims of New England pointedly spent their first December 25 in the New World working normally. Puritans such as Cotton Mather condemned Christmas both because scripture did not mention its observance and because Christmas celebrations of the day often involved boisterous behavior. Many non-Puritans in New England deplored the loss of the holidays enjoyed by the laboring classes in England. Christmas observance was outlawed in Boston in 1659. The ban on Christmas observance was revoked in 1681 by English governor Edmund Andros, but it was not until the mid-19th century that celebrating Christmas became fashionable in the Boston region.

At the same time, Christian residents of Virginia and New York observed the holiday freely. Pennsylvania Dutch settlers, predominantly Moravian settlers of Bethlehem, Nazareth, and Lititz in Pennsylvania and the Wachovia settlements in North Carolina, were enthusiastic celebrators of Christmas. The Moravians in Bethlehem had the first Christmas trees in America as well as the first Nativity Scenes. Christmas fell out of favor in the United States after the American Revolution, when it was considered an English custom.
George Washington attacked Hessian (German) mercenaries on the day after Christmas during the Battle of Trenton on December 26, 1776, Christmas being much more popular in Germany than in America at this time.

With the atheistic Cult of Reason in power during the era of Revolutionary France, Christian Christmas religious services were banned and the three kings cake was renamed the "equality cake" under anticlerical government policies.

19th century 

In the early-19th century, writers imagined Tudor Christmas as a time of heartfelt celebration. In 1843, Charles Dickens wrote the novel A Christmas Carol, which helped revive the "spirit" of Christmas and seasonal merriment. Its instant popularity played a major role in portraying Christmas as a holiday emphasizing family, goodwill, and compassion.

Dickens sought to construct Christmas as a family-centered festival of generosity, linking "worship and feasting, within a context of social reconciliation." Superimposing his humanitarian vision of the holiday, in what has been termed "Carol Philosophy", Dickens influenced many aspects of Christmas that are celebrated today in Western culture, such as family gatherings, seasonal food and drink, dancing, games, and a festive generosity of spirit. A prominent phrase from the tale, "Merry Christmas", was popularized following the appearance of the story. This coincided with the appearance of the Oxford Movement and the growth of Anglo-Catholicism, which led a revival in traditional rituals and religious observances.

The term Scrooge became a synonym for miser, with "Bah! Humbug!" dismissive of the festive spirit. In 1843, the first commercial Christmas card was produced by Sir Henry Cole. The revival of the Christmas Carol began with William Sandys's "Christmas Carols Ancient and Modern" (1833), with the first appearance in print of "The First Noel", "I Saw Three Ships", "Hark the Herald Angels Sing" and "God Rest Ye Merry, Gentlemen", popularized in Dickens' A Christmas Carol.

In Britain, the Christmas tree was introduced in the early 19th century by the German-born Queen Charlotte. In 1832, the future Queen Victoria wrote about her delight at having a Christmas tree, hung with lights, ornaments, and presents placed round it. After her marriage to her German cousin Prince Albert, by 1841 the custom became more widespread throughout Britain.

An image of the British royal family with their Christmas tree at Windsor Castle created a sensation when it was published in the Illustrated London News in 1848. A modified version of this image was published in Godey's Lady's Book, Philadelphia in 1850. By the 1870s, putting up a Christmas tree had become common in America.

In America, interest in Christmas had been revived in the 1820s by several short stories by Washington Irving which appear in his The Sketch Book of Geoffrey Crayon, Gent. and "Old Christmas". Irving's stories depicted harmonious warm-hearted English Christmas festivities he experienced while staying in Aston Hall, Birmingham, England, that had largely been abandoned, and he used the tract Vindication of Christmas (1652) of Old English Christmas traditions, that he had transcribed into his journal as a format for his stories.

In 1822, Clement Clarke Moore wrote the poem A Visit From St. Nicholas (popularly known by its first line: Twas the Night Before Christmas).
The poem helped popularize the tradition of exchanging gifts, and seasonal Christmas shopping began to assume economic importance.
This also started the cultural conflict between the holiday's spiritual significance and its associated commercialism that some see as corrupting the holiday. In her 1850 book The First Christmas in New England, Harriet Beecher Stowe includes a character who complains that the true meaning of Christmas was lost in a shopping spree.

While the celebration of Christmas was not yet customary in some regions in the U.S., Henry Wadsworth Longfellow detected "a transition state about Christmas here in New England" in 1856. "The old puritan feeling prevents it from being a cheerful, hearty holiday; though every year makes it more so."
In Reading, Pennsylvania, a newspaper remarked in 1861, "Even our presbyterian friends who have hitherto steadfastly ignored Christmas—threw open their church doors and assembled in force to celebrate the anniversary of the Savior's birth."

The First Congregational Church of Rockford, Illinois, "although of genuine Puritan stock", was 'preparing for a grand Christmas jubilee', a news correspondent reported in 1864. By 1860, fourteen states including several from New England had adopted Christmas as a legal holiday. In 1875, Louis Prang introduced the Christmas card to Americans. He has been called the "father of the American Christmas card". On June 28, 1870, Christmas was formally declared a United States federal holiday.

20th century 

During the First World War and particularly (but not exclusively) in 1914, a series of informal truces took place for Christmas between opposing armies. The truces, which were organised spontaneously by fighting men, ranged from promises not to shoot shouted at a distance in order to ease the pressure of war for the day to friendly socializing, gift giving and even sport between enemies. These incidents became a well known and semi-mythologised part of popular memory. They have been described as a symbol of common humanity even in the darkest of situations and used to demonstrate to children the ideals of Christmas.

Up to the 1950s in the UK, many Christmas customs were restricted to the upper classes and better-off families. The mass of the population had not adopted many of the Christmas rituals that later became general. The Christmas tree was rare. Christmas dinner might be beef or goose – certainly not turkey. In their stockings children might get an apple, orange, and sweets. Full celebration of a family Christmas with all the trimmings only became widespread with increased prosperity from the 1950s. National papers were published on Christmas Day until 1912. Post was still delivered on Christmas Day until 1961. League football matches continued in Scotland until the 1970s while in England they ceased at the end of the 1950s.

Under the state atheism of the Soviet Union, after its foundation in 1917, Christmas celebrations—along with other Christian holidays—were prohibited in public. During the 1920s, '30s, and '40s, the League of Militant Atheists encouraged school pupils to campaign against Christmas traditions, such as the Christmas tree, as well as other Christian holidays, including Easter; the League established an antireligious holiday to be the 31st of each month as a replacement. At the height of this persecution, in 1929, on Christmas Day, children in Moscow were encouraged to spit on crucifixes as a protest against the holiday. Instead, the importance of the holiday and all its trappings, such as the Christmas tree and gift-giving, was transferred to the New Year. It was not until the dissolution of the Soviet Union in 1991 that the persecution ended and Orthodox Christmas became a state holiday again for the first time in Russia after seven decades.

European History Professor Joseph Perry wrote that likewise, in Nazi Germany, "because Nazi ideologues saw organized religion as an enemy of the totalitarian state, propagandists sought to deemphasize—or eliminate altogether—the Christian aspects of the holiday" and that "Propagandists tirelessly promoted numerous Nazified Christmas songs, which replaced Christian themes with the regime's racial ideologies."

As Christmas celebrations began to be held around the world even outside traditional Christian cultures in the 20th century, some Muslim-majority countries subsequently banned the practice of Christmas, claiming it undermines Islam.

Observance and traditions 

Christmas Day is celebrated as a major festival and public holiday in countries around the world, including many whose populations are mostly non-Christian. In some non-Christian areas, periods of former colonial rule introduced the celebration (e.g. Hong Kong); in others, Christian minorities or foreign cultural influences have led populations to observe the holiday. Countries such as Japan, where Christmas is popular despite there being only a small number of Christians, have adopted many of the cultural aspects of Christmas, such as gift-giving, decorations, and Christmas trees. A similar example is in Turkey, being Muslim-majority and with a small number of Christians, where Christmas trees and decorations tend to line public streets during the festival.

Among countries with a strong Christian tradition, a variety of Christmas celebrations have developed that incorporate regional and local cultures.

Church attendance 

Christmas Day (inclusive of its vigil, Christmas Eve), is a Festival in the Lutheran Churches, a solemnity in the Roman Catholic Church, and a Principal Feast of the Anglican Communion. Other Christian denominations do not rank their feast days but nevertheless place importance on Christmas Eve/Christmas Day, as with other Christian feasts like Easter, Ascension Day, and Pentecost. As such, for Christians, attending a Christmas Eve or Christmas Day church service plays an important part in the recognition of the Christmas season. Christmas, along with Easter, is the period of highest annual church attendance. A 2010 survey by LifeWay Christian Resources found that six in ten Americans attend church services during this time. In the United Kingdom, the Church of England reported an estimated attendance of  people at Christmas services in 2015.

Decorations 

Nativity scenes are known from 10th-century Rome. They were popularised by Saint Francis of Assisi from 1223, quickly spreading across Europe. Different types of decorations developed across the Christian world, dependent on local tradition and available resources, and can vary from simple representations of the crib to far more elaborate sets – renowned manger scene traditions include the colourful Kraków szopka in Poland, which imitate Kraków's historical buildings as settings, the elaborate Italian presepi (Neapolitan, Genoese and Bolognese), or the Provençal crèches in southern France, using hand-painted terracotta figurines called santons. In certain parts of the world, notably Sicily, living nativity scenes following the tradition of Saint Francis are a popular alternative to static crèches. The first commercially produced decorations appeared in Germany in the 1860s, inspired by paper chains made by children. In countries where a representation of the Nativity scene is very popular, people are encouraged to compete and create the most original or realistic ones. Within some families, the pieces used to make the representation are considered a valuable family heirloom.

The traditional colors of Christmas decorations are red, green, and gold. Red symbolizes the blood of Jesus, which was shed in his crucifixion; green symbolizes eternal life, and in particular the evergreen tree, which does not lose its leaves in the winter; and gold is the first color associated with Christmas, as one of the three gifts of the Magi, symbolizing royalty.

The Christmas tree was first used by German Lutherans in the 16th century, with records indicating that a Christmas tree was placed in the Cathedral of Strassburg in 1539, under the leadership of the Protestant Reformer, Martin Bucer. In the United States, these "German Lutherans brought the decorated Christmas tree with them; the Moravians put lighted candles on those trees." When decorating the Christmas tree, many individuals place a star at the top of the tree symbolizing the Star of Bethlehem, a fact recorded by The School Journal in 1897. Professor David Albert Jones of Oxford University writes that in the 19th century, it became popular for people to also use an angel to top the Christmas tree in order to symbolize the angels mentioned in the accounts of the Nativity of Jesus. Additionally, in the context of a Christian celebration of Christmas, the Christmas tree, being evergreen in colour, is symbolic of Christ, who offers eternal life; the candles or lights on the tree represent the Light of the World—Jesus—born in Bethlehem. Christian services for family use and public worship have been published for the blessing of a Christmas tree, after it has been erected. The Christmas tree is considered by some as Christianisation of pagan tradition and ritual surrounding the Winter Solstice, which included the use of evergreen boughs, and an adaptation of pagan tree worship; according to eighth-century biographer Æddi Stephanus, Saint Boniface (634–709), who was a missionary in Germany, took an ax to an oak tree dedicated to Thor and pointed out a fir tree, which he stated was a more fitting object of reverence because it pointed to heaven and it had a triangular shape, which he said was symbolic of the Trinity. The English language phrase "Christmas tree" is first recorded in 1835 and represents an importation from the German language.

Since the 16th century, the poinsettia, a native plant from Mexico, has been associated with Christmas carrying the Christian symbolism of the Star of Bethlehem; in that country it is known in Spanish as the Flower of the Holy Night. Other popular holiday plants include holly, mistletoe, red amaryllis, and Christmas cactus.

Other traditional decorations include bells, candles, candy canes, stockings, wreaths, and angels. Both the displaying of wreaths and candles in each window are a more traditional Christmas display. The concentric assortment of leaves, usually from an evergreen, make up Christmas wreaths and are designed to prepare Christians for the Advent season. Candles in each window are meant to demonstrate the fact that Christians believe that Jesus Christ is the ultimate light of the world.

Christmas lights and banners may be hung along streets, music played from speakers, and Christmas trees placed in prominent places. It is common in many parts of the world for town squares and consumer shopping areas to sponsor and display decorations. Rolls of brightly colored paper with secular or religious Christmas motifs are manufactured for the purpose of wrapping gifts. In some countries, Christmas decorations are traditionally taken down on Twelfth Night.

Nativity play 

For the Christian celebration of Christmas, the viewing of the Nativity play is one of the oldest Christmastime traditions, with the first reenactment of the Nativity of Jesus taking place in A.D. 1223. In that year, Francis of Assisi assembled a Nativity scene outside of his church in Italy and children sung Christmas carols celebrating the birth of Jesus. Each year, this grew larger and people travelled from afar to see Francis' depiction of the Nativity of Jesus that came to feature drama and music. Nativity plays eventually spread throughout all of Europe, where they remain popular. Christmas Eve and Christmas Day church services often came to feature Nativity plays, as did schools and theatres. In France, Germany, Mexico and Spain, Nativity plays are often reenacted outdoors in the streets.

Music and carols 

The earliest extant specifically Christmas hymns appear in fourth-century Rome. Latin hymns such as "Veni redemptor gentium", written by Ambrose, Archbishop of Milan, were austere statements of the theological doctrine of the Incarnation in opposition to Arianism. "Corde natus ex Parentis" ("Of the Father's love begotten") by the Spanish poet Prudentius (d. 413) is still sung in some churches today. In the 9th and 10th centuries, the Christmas "Sequence" or "Prose" was introduced in North European monasteries, developing under Bernard of Clairvaux into a sequence of rhymed stanzas. In the 12th century the Parisian monk Adam of St. Victor began to derive music from popular songs, introducing something closer to the traditional Christmas carol. Christmas carols in English appear in a 1426 work of John Awdlay who lists twenty five "caroles of Cristemas", probably sung by groups of 'wassailers', who went from house to house.

The songs now known specifically as carols were originally communal folk songs sung during celebrations such as "harvest tide" as well as Christmas. It was only later that carols began to be sung in church. Traditionally, carols have often been based on medieval chord patterns, and it is this that gives them their uniquely characteristic musical sound. Some carols like "Personent hodie", "Good King Wenceslas", and "In dulci jubilo" can be traced directly back to the Middle Ages. They are among the oldest musical compositions still regularly sung. "Adeste Fideles" (O Come all ye faithful) appears in its current form in the mid-18th century.

The singing of carols increased in popularity after the Protestant Reformation in the Lutheran areas of Europe, as the Reformer Martin Luther wrote carols and encouraged their use in worship, in addition to spearheading the practice of caroling outside the Mass. The 18th-century English reformer Charles Wesley, an early Methodist divine, understood the importance of music to Christian worship. In addition to setting many psalms to melodies, he wrote texts for at least three Christmas carols. The best known was originally entitled "Hark! How All the Welkin Rings", later renamed "Hark! the Herald Angels Sing".

Christmas seasonal songs of a nonreligious nature emerged in the late 18th century. The Welsh melody for "Deck the Halls" dates from 1794, with the lyrics added by Scottish musician Thomas Oliphant in 1862, and the American "Jingle Bells" was copyrighted in 1857. Other popular carols include "The First Noel", "God Rest You Merry, Gentlemen", "The Holly and the Ivy", "I Saw Three Ships", "In the Bleak Midwinter", "Joy to the World", "Once in Royal David's City" and "While Shepherds Watched Their Flocks". In the 19th and 20th centuries, African American spirituals and songs about Christmas, based in their tradition of spirituals, became more widely known. An increasing number of seasonal holiday songs were commercially produced in the 20th century, including jazz and blues variations. In addition, there was a revival of interest in early music, from groups singing folk music, such as The Revels, to performers of early medieval and classical music.

One of the most ubiquitous festive songs is "We Wish You a Merry Christmas", which originates from the West Country of England in the 1930s. Radio has covered Christmas music from variety shows from the 1940s and 1950s, as well as modern-day stations that exclusively play Christmas music from late November through December 25. Hollywood movies have featured new Christmas music, such as "White Christmas" in Holiday Inn and Rudolph the Red-Nosed Reindeer. Traditional carols have also been included in Hollywood films, such as "Hark! the Herald Angels Sing" in It's a Wonderful Life (1946), and "Silent Night" in A Christmas Story.

Traditional cuisine 

A special Christmas family meal is traditionally an important part of the holiday's celebration, and the food that is served varies greatly from country to country. Some regions have special meals for Christmas Eve, such as Sicily, where 12 kinds of fish are served. In the United Kingdom and countries influenced by its traditions, a standard Christmas meal includes turkey, goose or other large bird, gravy, potatoes, vegetables, sometimes bread and cider. Special desserts are also prepared, such as Christmas pudding, mince pies, Christmas cake, Panettone and Yule log cake. Traditional Christmas meal in Central Europe is fried carp or other fish.

Cards 

Christmas cards are illustrated messages of greeting exchanged between friends and family members during the weeks preceding Christmas Day. The traditional greeting reads "wishing you a Merry Christmas and a Happy New Year", much like that of the first commercial Christmas card, produced by Sir Henry Cole in London in 1843. The custom of sending them has become popular among a wide cross-section of people with the emergence of the modern trend towards exchanging E-cards.

Christmas cards are purchased in considerable quantities and feature artwork, commercially designed and relevant to the season. The content of the design might relate directly to the Christmas narrative, with depictions of the Nativity of Jesus, or Christian symbols such as the Star of Bethlehem, or a white dove, which can represent both the Holy Spirit and Peace on Earth. Other Christmas cards are more secular and can depict Christmas traditions, mythical figures such as Santa Claus, objects directly associated with Christmas such as candles, holly, and baubles, or a variety of images associated with the season, such as Christmastide activities, snow scenes, and the wildlife of the northern winter.

Some prefer cards with a poem, prayer, or Biblical verse; while others distance themselves from religion with an all-inclusive "Season's greetings".

Commemorative stamps 

A number of nations have issued commemorative stamps at Christmastide. Postal customers will often use these stamps to mail Christmas cards, and they are popular with philatelists. These stamps are regular postage stamps, unlike Christmas seals, and are valid for postage year-round. They usually go on sale sometime between early October and early December and are printed in considerable quantities.

Gift giving 

The exchanging of gifts is one of the core aspects of the modern Christmas celebration, making it the most profitable time of year for retailers and businesses throughout the world. On Christmas, people exchange gifts based on the Christian tradition associated with Saint Nicholas, and the gifts of gold, frankincense, and myrrh which were given to the baby Jesus by the Magi. The practice of gift giving in the Roman celebration of Saturnalia may have influenced Christian customs, but on the other hand the Christian "core dogma of the Incarnation, however, solidly established the giving and receiving of gifts as the structural principle of that recurrent yet unique event", because it was the Biblical Magi, "together with all their fellow men, who received the gift of God through man's renewed participation in the divine life." However, Thomas J. Talley holds that the Roman Emperor Aurelian placed the alternate festival on December 25 in order to compete with the growing rate of the Christian Church, which had already been celebrating Christmas on that date first.

Gift-bearing figures 

A number of figures are associated with Christmas and the seasonal giving of gifts. Among these are Father Christmas, also known as Santa Claus (derived from the Dutch for Saint Nicholas), Père Noël, and the Weihnachtsmann; Saint Nicholas or Sinterklaas; the Christkind; Kris Kringle; Joulupukki; tomte/nisse; Babbo Natale; Saint Basil; and Ded Moroz. The Scandinavian tomte (also called nisse) is sometimes depicted as a gnome instead of Santa Claus.

The best known of these figures today is red-dressed Santa Claus, of diverse origins. The name Santa Claus can be traced back to the Dutch Sinterklaas, which means simply Saint Nicholas. Among other saintly attributes, he was noted for the care of children, generosity, and the giving of gifts. His feast day, December 6, came to be celebrated in many countries with the giving of gifts.

Saint Nicholas traditionally appeared in bishop's attire, accompanied by helpers, inquiring about the behaviour of children during the past year before deciding whether they deserved a gift or not. By the 13th century, Saint Nicholas was well known in the Netherlands, and the practice of gift-giving in his name spread to other parts of central and southern Europe. At the Reformation in 16th–17th-century Europe, many Protestants changed the gift bringer to the Christ Child or Christkindl, corrupted in English to Kris Kringle, and the date of giving gifts changed from December 6 to Christmas Eve.

The modern popular image of Santa Claus, however, was created in the United States, and in particular in New York. The transformation was accomplished with the aid of notable contributors including Washington Irving and the German-American cartoonist Thomas Nast (1840–1902). Following the American Revolutionary War, some of the inhabitants of New York City sought out symbols of the city's non-English past. New York had originally been established as the Dutch colonial town of New Amsterdam and the Dutch Sinterklaas tradition was reinvented as Saint Nicholas.

Current tradition in several Latin American countries (such as Venezuela and Colombia) holds that while Santa makes the toys, he then gives them to the Baby Jesus, who is the one who actually delivers them to the children's homes, a reconciliation between traditional religious beliefs and the iconography of Santa Claus imported from the United States.

In South Tyrol (Italy), Austria, Czech Republic, Southern Germany, Hungary, Liechtenstein, Slovakia, and Switzerland, the Christkind (Ježíšek in Czech, Jézuska in Hungarian and Ježiško in Slovak) brings the presents. Greek children get their presents from Saint Basil on New Year's Eve, the eve of that saint's liturgical feast. The German St. Nikolaus is not identical with the Weihnachtsmann (who is the German version of Santa Claus / Father Christmas). St. Nikolaus wears a bishop's dress and still brings small gifts (usually candies, nuts, and fruits) on December 6 and is accompanied by Knecht Ruprecht. Although many parents around the world routinely teach their children about Santa Claus and other gift bringers, some have come to reject this practice, considering it deceptive.

Multiple gift-giver figures exist in Poland, varying between regions and individual families. St Nicholas (Święty Mikołaj) dominates Central and North-East areas, the Starman (Gwiazdor) is most common in Greater Poland, Baby Jesus (Dzieciątko) is unique to Upper Silesia, with the Little Star (Gwiazdka) and the Little Angel (Aniołek) being common in the South and the South-East. Grandfather Frost (Dziadek Mróz) is less commonly accepted in some areas of Eastern Poland. It is worth noting that across all of Poland, St Nicholas is the gift giver on the Saint Nicholas Day on December 6.

Date according to Julian calendar 

Some jurisdictions of the Eastern Orthodox Church, including those of Russia, Georgia, Ukraine, Macedonia, Montenegro, Serbia, and Jerusalem, mark feasts using the older Julian calendar. As a result, December 25 on the Julian calendar currently corresponds to January 7 on the calendar used by most governments and people in everyday life. Therefore, the aforementioned Orthodox Christians mark December 25 (and thus Christmas) on the day that is internationally considered to be January 7. On 18 October 2022 the Orthodox Church of Ukraine allowed its dioceses to hold Christmas services according to the Revised Julian calendar, i.e., December 25.

However, following the Council of Constantinople in 1923, other Orthodox Christians, such as those belonging to the jurisdictions of Constantinople, Bulgaria, Greece, Romania, Antioch, Alexandria, Albania, Cyprus, Finland, and the Orthodox Church in America, among others, began using the Revised Julian calendar, which at present corresponds exactly to the Gregorian calendar. Therefore, these Orthodox Christians mark December 25 (and thus Christmas) on the same day that is internationally considered to be December 25.

A further complication is added by the fact that the Armenian Apostolic Church continues the original ancient Eastern Christian practice of celebrating the birth of Christ not as a separate holiday, but on the same day as the celebration of his baptism (Theophany), which is on January 6. This is a public holiday in Armenia, and it is held on the same day that is internationally considered to be January 6, because since 1923 the Armenian Church in Armenia has used the Gregorian calendar.

However, there is also a small Armenian Patriarchate of Jerusalem, which maintains the traditional Armenian custom of celebrating the birth of Christ on the same day as Theophany (January 6), but uses the Julian calendar for the determination of that date. As a result, this church celebrates "Christmas" (more properly called Theophany) on the day that is considered January 19 on the Gregorian calendar in use by the majority of the world.

In summary, there are four different dates used by different Christian groups to mark the birth of Christ, given in the table below.

Listing

Economy 

Christmas is typically a peak selling season for retailers in many nations around the world. Sales increase dramatically as people purchase gifts, decorations, and supplies to celebrate. In the United States, the "Christmas shopping season" starts as early as October. In Canada, merchants begin advertising campaigns just before Halloween (October 31), and step up their marketing following Remembrance Day on November 11. In the UK and Ireland, the Christmas shopping season starts from mid-November, around the time when high street Christmas lights are turned on. In the United States, it has been calculated that a quarter of all personal spending takes place during the Christmas/holiday shopping season. Figures from the U.S. Census Bureau reveal that expenditure in department stores nationwide rose from $20.8 billion in November 2004 to $31.9 billion in December 2004, an increase of 54 percent. In other sectors, the pre-Christmas increase in spending was even greater, there being a November–December buying surge of 100 percent in bookstores and 170 percent in jewelry stores. In the same year employment in American retail stores rose from 1.6 million to 1.8 million in the two months leading up to Christmas. Industries completely dependent on Christmas include Christmas cards, of which 1.9 billion are sent in the United States each year, and live Christmas Trees, of which 20.8 million were cut in the U.S. in 2002. For 2019, the average US adult was projected to spend $920 on gifts alone. In the UK in 2010, up to £8 billion was expected to be spent online at Christmas, approximately a quarter of total retail festive sales.

In most Western nations, Christmas Day is the least active day of the year for business and commerce; almost all retail, commercial and institutional businesses are closed, and almost all industries cease activity (more than any other day of the year), whether laws require such or not. In England and Wales, the Christmas Day (Trading) Act 2004 prevents all large shops from trading on Christmas Day. Similar legislation was approved in Scotland in 2007. Film studios release many high-budget movies during the holiday season, including Christmas films, fantasy movies or high-tone dramas with high production values to hopes of maximizing the chance of nominations for the Academy Awards.

One economist's analysis calculates that, despite increased overall spending, Christmas is a deadweight loss under orthodox microeconomic theory, because of the effect of gift-giving. This loss is calculated as the difference between what the gift giver spent on the item and what the gift receiver would have paid for the item. It is estimated that in 2001, Christmas resulted in a $4 billion deadweight loss in the U.S. alone. Because of complicating factors, this analysis is sometimes used to discuss possible flaws in current microeconomic theory. Other deadweight losses include the effects of Christmas on the environment and the fact that material gifts are often perceived as white elephants, imposing cost for upkeep and storage and contributing to clutter.

Controversies 

Christmas has at times been the subject of controversy and attacks from various sources, both Christian and non-Christian. Historically, it was prohibited by Puritans during their ascendency in the Commonwealth of England (1647–1660), and in Colonial New England where the Puritans outlawed the celebration of Christmas in 1659 on the grounds that Christmas was not mentioned in Scripture and therefore violated the Reformed regulative principle of worship. The Parliament of Scotland, which was dominated by Presbyterians, passed a series of acts outlawing the observance of Christmas between 1637 and 1690; Christmas Day did not become a public holiday in Scotland until 1871. Today, some conservative Reformed denominations such as the Free Presbyterian Church of Scotland and the Reformed Presbyterian Church of North America likewise reject the celebration of Christmas based on the regulative principle and what they see as its non-Scriptural origin. Christmas celebrations have also been prohibited by atheist states such as the Soviet Union and more recently majority Muslim states such as Somalia, Tajikistan and Brunei.

Some Christians and organizations such as Pat Robertson's American Center for Law and Justice cite alleged attacks on Christmas (dubbing them a "war on Christmas"). Such groups claim that any specific mention of the term "Christmas" or its religious aspects is being increasingly censored, avoided, or discouraged by a number of advertisers, retailers, government (prominently schools), and other public and private organizations. One controversy is the occurrence of Christmas trees being renamed Holiday trees. In the U.S. there has been a tendency to replace the greeting Merry Christmas with Happy Holidays, which is considered inclusive at the time of the Jewish celebration of Hanukkah. In the U.S. and Canada, where the use of the term "Holidays" is most prevalent, opponents have denounced its usage and avoidance of using the term "Christmas" as being politically correct. In 1984, the U.S. Supreme Court ruled in Lynch v. Donnelly that a Christmas display (which included a Nativity scene) owned and displayed by the city of Pawtucket, Rhode Island, did not violate the First Amendment. American Muslim scholar Abdul Malik Mujahid has said that Muslims must treat Christmas with respect, even if they disagree with it.

The government of the People's Republic of China officially espouses state atheism, and has conducted antireligious campaigns to this end. In December 2018, officials raided Christian churches prior to Christmastide and coerced them to close; Christmas trees and Santa Clauses were also forcibly removed.

See also 

 
 
 
 List of Christmas films
 
 
 
 
 
 
 Mithraism in comparison with other belief systems#25th of December

Notes

References

Further reading 

 Bowler, Gerry, The World Encyclopedia of Christmas (October 2004: McClelland & Stewart). 
 Bowler, Gerry, Santa Claus: A Biography (November 2007: McClelland & Stewart). 
 Comfort, David, Just Say Noel: A History of Christmas from the Nativity to the Nineties (November 1995: Fireside). 
 Count, Earl W., 4000 Years of Christmas: A Gift from the Ages (November 1997: Ulysses Press). 
 Federer, William J., There Really Is a Santa Claus: The History of St. Nicholas & Christmas Holiday Traditions  (December 2002: Amerisearch). 
 Kelly, Joseph F., The Origins of Christmas  (August 2004: Liturgical Press). 
 Miles, Clement A., Christmas Customs and Traditions  (1976: Dover Publications). 
 Nissenbaum, Stephen, The Battle for Christmas (1996; New York: Vintage Books, 1997). 
 
 Rosenthal, Jim, St. Nicholas: A Closer Look at Christmas (July 2006: Nelson Reference).

External links 

 Christmas: Its Origin and Associations, by William Francis Dawson, 1902, from Project Gutenberg

 
December observances
Quarter days
Birthdays
Feasts of Jesus Christ
Federal holidays in the United States
Public holidays in Albania
Public holidays in Andorra
Public holidays in Angola
Public holidays in Argentina
Public holidays in Armenia
Public holidays in Australia
Public holidays in Austria
Public holidays in the Bahamas
Public holidays in Bangladesh
Public holidays in Barbados
Public holidays in Belarus
Public holidays in Belgium
Public holidays in Belize
Public holidays in Bolivia
Public holidays in Botswana
Public holidays in Brazil
Public holidays in Brunei
Public holidays in Bulgaria
Public holidays in Canada
Public holidays in Cape Verde
Public holidays in Colombia
Public holidays in Costa Rica
Public holidays in Croatia
Public holidays in Cuba
Public holidays in Cyprus
Public holidays in the Czech Republic
Public holidays in Denmark
Public holidays in the Dominican Republic
Public holidays in El Salvador
Public holidays in Estonia
Public holidays in Finland
Public holidays in France
Public holidays in Germany
Public holidays in Ghana
Public holidays in Greece
Public holidays in Guatemala
Public holidays in Guyana
Public holidays in Haiti
Public holidays in Honduras
Public holidays in Hungary
Public holidays in Iceland
Public holidays in Indonesia
Public holidays in the Republic of Ireland
Public holidays in Italy
Public holidays in Jamaica
Public holidays in Kazakhstan
Public holidays in Kenya
Public holidays in Kyrgyzstan
Public holidays in Latvia
Public holidays in Lebanon
Public holidays in Liechtenstein
Public holidays in Lithuania
Public holidays in Luxembourg
Public holidays in Malaysia
Public holidays in Malta
Public holidays in the Marshall Islands
Public holidays in Mauritius
Public holidays in Mexico
Public holidays in the Federated States of Micronesia
Public holidays in Moldova
Public holidays in Montenegro
Public holidays in Myanmar
Public holidays in Namibia
Public holidays in Nepal
Public holidays in the Netherlands
Public holidays in New Zealand
Public holidays in Nicaragua
Public holidays in Niger
Public holidays in Nigeria
Public holidays in Norway
Public holidays in Papua New Guinea
Public holidays in Paraguay
Public holidays in Peru
Public holidays in the Philippines
Public holidays in Poland
Public holidays in Portugal
Public holidays in North Macedonia
Public holidays in Romania
Public holidays in Russia
Public holidays in Rwanda
Public holidays in Serbia
Public holidays in Singapore
Public holidays in Slovakia
Public holidays in Slovenia
Public holidays in South Africa
Public holidays in South Korea
Public holidays in Spain
Public holidays in Sri Lanka
Public holidays in Suriname
Public holidays in Sweden
Public holidays in Switzerland
Public holidays in Syria
Public holidays in Tanzania
Public holidays in Trinidad and Tobago
Public holidays in Uganda
Public holidays in Ukraine
Public holidays in the United Kingdom
Public holidays in the United States
Public holidays in Uruguay
Public holidays in Venezuela
Public holidays in Zambia
Public holidays in Zimbabwe